Lammasjärvi  is a medium-sized lake in the Oulujoki main catchment area. It is located in the Kainuu region, Kuhmo municipality in Finland.

See also
List of lakes in Finland

References

External links
 

Kuhmo
Lakes of Kuhmo